Graham Fuller (born 8 September 1931) is a South African former cricketer. He played in ten first-class matches for Border in 1950/51 and 1951/52.

See also
 List of Border representative cricketers

References

External links
 

1931 births
Living people
South African cricketers
Border cricketers
People from Queenstown, South Africa
Cricketers from the Eastern Cape